In human brain anatomy, an operculum (Latin, meaning "little lid") (pl. opercula), may refer to the frontal, temporal, or parietal operculum, which together cover the insula as the opercula of insula. It can also refer to the occipital operculum, part of the occipital lobe.

The insular lobe is a portion of the cerebral cortex that has invaginated to lie deep within the lateral sulcus. It sits like an island (the meaning of insular) almost surrounded by the groove of the circular sulcus and covered over and obscured by the insular opercula.

A part of the parietal lobe, the frontoparietal operculum, covers the upper part of the insular lobe from the front to the back. The opercula lie on the precentral and postcentral gyri (on either side of the central sulcus).
The part of the parietal operculum that forms the ceiling of the lateral sulcus functions as the secondary somatosensory cortex.

Development 
Normally, the insular opercula begin to develop between the 20th and the 22nd  weeks of pregnancy. At weeks 14 to 16 of fetal development, the insula  begins to invaginate from the surface of the immature cerebrum of the  brain, until at full term, the opercula completely cover the insula. This process is called opercularization.

Case reports

Albert Einstein's brain
Opinions differ on whether Albert Einstein’s brain possessed parietal opercula. Falk, et al. claim that the brain actually did have parietal opercula, while Witelson et al. claim that it did not.

Einstein's lower parietal lobe (which is involved in mathematical thought, visuospatial cognition and imagery of movement) was 15% larger than average.

Figure 9 of Falk 2013 is a photograph of Einstein's right insula after removal of the operculum. (Falk 2013)

See also 
Sulcus lateralis 
Circular sulcus of insula

Notes

References 

 

Cerebrum
Albert Einstein